Donley may refer to:

Surname
Charles "Red" Donley (1923–1998), long-time sports and news anchor in the Ohio Valley
Doug Donley (born 1959), former American football wide receiver
Jimmy Donley (1929–1963), American singer-songwriter
Joseph Benton Donley (1838–1917), Republican member of the U.S. House of Representatives from Pennsylvania
Kerry J. Donley (1956–2022), Democratic member of the Alexandria, Virginia City Council
Kevin Donley (born 1951), American football coach and former player
Kimberly Donley (born 1965), American adult model and actress
Michael B. Donley (born 1952), the 22nd Secretary of the United States Air Force
Roy Donley (1885–1939), businessman, became a member of the Berkeley, California, Board of Park Commissioners
S. Donley Ritchey, managing partner of Alpine Partners, a family investment general partnership in Danville, California
Stockton P. Donley (1821–1871), Justice of the Supreme Court of Texas
Willis E. Donley (1901–1985), American politician and lawyer

Placename
Donley County, Texas, county located in the U.S. state of Texas
Donley Island, Pennsylvania, privately owned alluvial island in the Allegheny River in the U.S. state of Pennsylvania

See also
Donnelay
Donnelly
Downley
Dunalley (disambiguation)
Dunley (disambiguation)